Ewen Glass (born 25 December 1982) is an Irish playwright and screenwriter. Ewen first came to notice in the British film industry as the writer of Basement, a feature horror film starring Danny Dyer.

Filmography

Basement 	
A Nurse Called Laura 	
The Castle and The King 	
Kamera
We Saw Zebras 		
Tough Love

Awards
Playwright of the Year (Ireland) (2000)  
Attori in Cerca D'Autore Festival Award  (2008)

References

1982 births
Living people
Irish dramatists and playwrights
Irish male dramatists and playwrights